The 2015–16 NBA Development League season was the 15th season of the NBA Development League (NBA D-League). The NBA D-League is the official minor league basketball organization owned by the National Basketball Association (NBA).

The League expanded to a record 19 teams for the 2015–16 season. An expansion team, Raptors 905, joined the 18 teams from the previous season, while the Fort Wayne Mad Ants were purchased by the Indiana Pacers, leaving just 11 NBA teams without a D-League affiliate for this season (in the 2016–17 season the number of NBA teams without a D-League affiliate will reduce to 8 with the debuts of franchises owned by the Brooklyn Nets, Charlotte Hornets, and Chicago Bulls).

The league consisted of two conferences with two divisions each, three with five and one with four. To even out the divisions, the Canton Charge were moved from the East Division to the Central Division.

Teams

Austin Spurs (affiliated with the San Antonio Spurs)
Bakersfield Jam (affiliated with the Phoenix Suns)
Canton Charge (affiliated with the Cleveland Cavaliers)
Delaware 87ers (affiliated with the Philadelphia 76ers)
Erie BayHawks (affiliated with the Orlando Magic)
Fort Wayne Mad Ants (affiliated with the Indiana Pacers)
Grand Rapids Drive (affiliated with the Detroit Pistons)
Idaho Stampede (affiliated with the Utah Jazz)
Iowa Energy (affiliated with the Memphis Grizzlies)
Los Angeles D-Fenders (affiliated with the Los Angeles Lakers)
Maine Red Claws (affiliated with the Boston Celtics)
Oklahoma City Blue (affiliated with the Oklahoma City Thunder)
Raptors 905 (affiliated with the Toronto Raptors)
Reno Bighorns (affiliated with the Sacramento Kings)
Rio Grande Valley Vipers (affiliated with the Houston Rockets)
Santa Cruz Warriors (affiliated with the Golden State Warriors)
Sioux Falls Skyforce (affiliated with the Miami Heat)
Texas Legends (affiliated with the Dallas Mavericks)
Westchester Knicks (affiliated with the New York Knicks)

Regular season

Eastern Conference

Atlantic Division

Central Division

Western Conference

Pacific Division

Southwest Division

Playoffs
The Sioux Falls Skyforce (winners of a record forty games during the regular season) won the title over the Los Angeles D-Fenders in three games, winning Game 1 104-99 before Los Angeles tied it up with a 109-102 victory in Game 2, and the Skyforce closed out the title with a 91-63 victory at home. It was their first D-League title and their third overall title, having won two titles (1996, 2005) in the Continental Basketball Association.

Awards and honors
NBA Development League Most Valuable Player Award: Jarnell Stokes, Sioux Falls Skyforce
Dennis Johnson Coach of the Year Award: Dan Craig, Sioux Falls Skyforce
NBA Development League Rookie of the Year Award: Quinn Cook, Canton Charge
NBA Development League Defensive Player of the Year Award: DeAndre Liggins, Sioux Falls Skyforce
NBA Development League Impact Player of the Year Award: Ryan Gomes, Los Angeles D-Fenders 
NBA Development League Most Improved Player Award: Axel Toupane, Raptors 905
Executive of the Year: Adam Simon, Sioux Falls Skyforce
Jason Collier Sportsmanship Award: Scott Suggs, Raptors 905
Development Champion Award:
All-Star Game MVP: Jimmer Fredette, Westchester Knicks
All-NBA Development League Team

First team	
Erick Green, Reno Bighorns		
Vander Blue, Los Angeles D-Fenders	
Jarnell Stokes, Sioux Falls Skyforce
Jeff Ayres, Idaho Stampede/Los Angeles D-Fenders		
Alex Stepheson, Iowa Energy

Second team
Jimmer Fredette, Westchester Knicks
Will Cummings, Rio Grande Valley Vipers
Coty Clarke, Maine Red Claws
Nick Minnerath, Canton Charge
DeAndre Liggins, Sioux Falls Skyforce

Third team
Sean Kilpatrick, Delaware 87ers
Quinn Cook, Canton Charge
Devin Ebanks, Grand Rapids Drive
Ryan Gomes, Los Angeles D-Fenders
Jordan Bachynski, Westchester Knicks

References

External links
Official website
2015–16 season overview